Rosny College is a government comprehensive senior secondary school located in , a suburb of Hobart, Tasmania, Australia. Established in 1973, the college caters for approximately 1,000 students in Years 11 and 12. The college is administered by the Tasmanian Department of Education.

In 2019 student enrolments were 984. The college principal is Sandy Menadue.

History
Rosny College was founded in 1973 to provide opportunities for post-Year 10 education in the City of Clarence and it draws the large majority of its students from associated schools on the eastern shore of the Derwent River in Hobart, including Bayview Secondary College, the Clarence, Rose Bay, and Sorell High Schools, and the Campania, Tasman, and Triabunna District Schools. The College is located close to the Derwent River and to the commercial and business centre of the district, which provide educational opportunities for its students.

See also 
 List of schools in Tasmania
 Education in Tasmania

References

External links
 Rosny College website

Educational institutions established in 1973
Colleges in Tasmania
Rock Eisteddfod Challenge participants
1973 establishments in England